The Nottingham Society of Artists is an art society in the city of Nottingham, England. It was founded in 1880.

The society is located at 71–73 Friar Lane, near Nottingham Castle and adjacent to the Friar Lane Gallery.
The Nottingham-based painter Arthur Spooner (1873–1962) was formerly a member of the society.

References

External links 
 Nottingham Society of Artists website

Arts organizations established in 1880
1880 establishments in England
Organisations based in Nottingham
Culture in Nottingham
English art
Art societies